The Sette-Cama Hunting Area is found in Gabon. It was established in 1966.This site covers 2,400.82 km.

Characteristic of this area is significant biodiversity, in addition to 15 species of bats, 75 species of reptiles and amphibians, 450 species of birds, this area is also important for several endangered mammals, such as elephants, duikers and hippos. People from the local community use this area for agriculture and traditional fishing.

References

Protected areas of Gabon